The Scheibe Spatz (German: "Sparrow") is a German glider with a mixed metal and wood construction that was built in 1952 until 1962. Later versions were known as the L-Spatz, the letter L standing for Leistung, which is German for "performance".

Scheibe Flugzeugbau built the Spatz A in 1952. Two years later in 1954 the first L-Spatz 55 was airborne.  Three hundred L-Spatz 55s were built in Germany, 155 in France under the name Avialsa A.60 Fauconnet, and 16 in Italy as the Meteor MS-30 L Passero; production was discontinued in 1962.

It is a single-seater cantilever shoulder-winged sailplane with a cruising (max L/D) speed of 45 mph. It has an empty weight of 157 kg and a maximum take-off weight of 269 kg. The single spar wing and tail were constructed using fabric-covered wood, whereas the fuselage consisted of steel tubing covered with fabric.

The L-Spatz 55 has good climbing performance due to light construction. The glide angle is 29:1. The longest known cross-country flight was more than 600 km from Burg Feuerstein, Germany to France.

Many gliding clubs operated the L-Spatz 55, well known for its easy handling, including easy recovery from a spin.

Variants
Spatz A
Certified in 1952 with a 13.20 metre wingspan, 6.19 m length.
Spatz B
Strengthened and improved variant with a 13.20 metre wingspan, 6.19 m length, certified in 1952.
Spatz 55
Certified in 1952 with a 13.20 metre wingspan, 6.25 m length.
L-Spatz
Certified in 1954 with a 15.00 metre wingspan, 6.05 m length.
L-Spatz 55
Certified in 1954 with a 15.00 metre wingspan,  6.25 m length.
L-Spatz III
Certified in 1966 with a 15.00 metre wingspan, 6.25 m length.

Avialsa 60 Fauconnet
Licence production in France.
Meteor MS-30 L-Passero
Licence production in Italy.
Electravia Electro Light 2
Electric aircraft version powered by an electric drive system, with a nose-mounted propeller.

Aircraft on display
Museum für Luftfahrt und Technik
National Soaring Museum
 Museum of Military Technique GRYF in Dąbrówka near Wejherowo (Poland)

Specifications (L-Spatz 55)

See also

Notes

References

External links

L-Spatz on sailplanedirectory.com

1950s German sailplanes
Glider aircraft
Spatz
Homebuilt aircraft
Aircraft first flown in 1952